So You Think You Can Dance, an American dance competition show, returned for its fourteenth season on Monday, June 12, 2017. The new season's judge panel once again features series creator Nigel Lythgoe (who also serves as executive producer), as well as the return of ballroom expert Mary Murphy, along with new permanent member Vanessa Hudgens joining the panel of judges, while Cat Deeley continues in her role as host for a thirteenth consecutive season.

Auditions

Open auditions for season 14 were held in two cities beginning in March 2017.

All-stars
The season will consist of All-stars acting as judges for the Academy round who, after each individual dance style challenge, select dancers to join their team of four dancers. They will ultimately each choose one dancer at the end of Academy who will move on to compete in the live shows.

The All-stars are:

 Gaby Diaz - Season 12 - Winner 
 Comfort Fedoke - Season 4 - Top 8 
 Marko Germar - Season 8 - Top 3 
 Jasmine Harper - Season 10 - Runner - Up 
 Allison Holker - Season 2 - Top 8 
 Jenna Johnson - Season 10 - Top 8 
 Paul Karmiryan - Season 10 - Top 6 
 Robert Roldan - Season 7 - Top 3 
 Cyrus Spencer - Season 9 - Runner - Up 
 Du-Shaunt "Fik-Shun" Stegall - Season 10 - Winner

Finals

Contestants

Elimination chart

Performances

Top 10 Perform, Part 1 (August 7, 2017)
Source, competing dancers' names:
 Judges: Nigel Lythgoe, Mary Murphy, Vanessa Hudgens

* All-star Allison Holker injured her shoulder during rehearsal and couldn't perform on the show. Season 9 alumna Audrey Case danced in her place with Holker's partner Logan Hernandez.

Top 10 Perform, Part 2 (August 14, 2017)
Group dance: Top 10 and all-stars: "You Should Be Dancing"—Bee Gees (Disco; Choreographers: Mandy Moore and Val Chmerkovskiy)
 Judges: Nigel Lythgoe, Mary Murphy, Vanessa Hudgens
Guest dancer(s): Lethal Ladies of Baltimore Leadership School for Young Women feat. All-Stars (Stepping)

Solos:

Top 9 Perform (August 21, 2017)
Group dance: 
Top 9 and all-stars: "Ya Yar"—Jonte' (Hip-hop; Choreographer: Luther Brown)
All-stars: "Strange Fruit"—Nina Simone (Contemporary; Choreographer: Travis Wall)
Top 9: "Hey Pachuco!"—Royal Crown Revue (Jazz/Broadway; Choreographer: Chris Baldock)
 Judges: Nigel Lythgoe, Mary Murphy, Vanessa Hudgens

Solos:

Top 8 Perform (August 28, 2017)
Group dance: 
Top 8 and all-stars: "Call Me Mother"—RuPaul (Jazz/Vogue; Choreographer: Mark Kanemura)
All-Stars: "Truth"—Balmorea (Contemporary; Choreographer: Jaci Royal)
 Judges: Nigel Lythgoe, Mary Murphy, Vanessa Hudgens

Top 7 Perform (September 4, 2017)
Group dance: 
Top 7 and all-stars: "Overture" — Merrily We Roll Along (2012 New York Cast) (Broadway; Choreographer: Warren Carlyle) 
All-Stars: "Derniére Danse" — Indila (Jazz; Choreographer: Brian Friedman)
 Judges: Nigel Lythgoe, Mary Murphy, Vanessa Hudgens

Solos:

Top 6 Perform (September 11, 2017)
Group dance: 
Top 6 and all-stars: "Prism" - Nathan Lanier (Hip-hop; Choreographer: Christopher Scott) 
All-Stars: "Floreana" - Baauer (Contemporary; Choreographer: Andrew Winghart) 
 Judges: Nigel Lythgoe, Mary Murphy, Vanessa Hudgens

Solos:

Top 4 Perform (September 18, 2017)
Group dance: 
Top 4 and all-stars:  "Mi Gente" — J Balvin & Willie William (Hip-hop; Choreographer: Napoleon & Tabitha D'Umo) 
Top 4:  "Elements"— Nathan Lanier (Contemporary; Choreographer: Travis Wall & Christopher Scott) 
All-Stars:  "DNA."—Kendrick Lamar (Hip-hop; Choreographer: Keone & Mari Madrid) 
 Judges: Nigel Lythgoe, Mary Murphy, Vanessa Hudgens

Solos:

Ratings

U.S. Nielsen ratings

References

2017 American television seasons
Season 14